This is an episode list of American sketch comedy show Rowan & Martin's Laugh-In.

The show consisted of a series of rapid-fire gags and sketches, and occasionally featured numerous guest stars in one episode. Many popular entertainers of the 1960s and early 1970s appeared on Laugh-In portraying characters in comedy sketches or appearing as themselves.

Series overview
<onlyinclude>

Episodes

Pilot Special (1967)

Season 1 (1968)

Season 2 (1968–69)

* denotes uncredited appearance

Season 3 (1969–1970)

* denotes uncredited appearance

Season 4 (1970–71)

Special (1971)

Season 5 (1971–72)

Season 6 (1972–73)

External links
 

Lists of variety television series episodes
Lists of American comedy television series episodes